Frank R. McGeoy (1868 - April 13, 1940) was an architect of Greenwood, Mississippi.

Early life
McGeoy was born in Memphis, Tennessee in 1868.

Career
McGeoy became an architect in Greenwood, Mississippi in 1908. He was a director of the Greenwood Chamber of Commerce.

A number of his works are listed on the National Register of Historic Places.

Works include:
Murphey-Jennings House, 307 Walnut St. Sumner, MS (McGeoy, Frank R.), NRHP-listed
Southworth House, 1108 Mississippi Ave. Greenwood, MS (McGeoy, Frank R.), NRHP-listed
Wesley Memorial Methodist Episcopal, 800 Howard St. Greenwood, MS (McGeoy, Frank R.), NRHP-listed
Wesley Methodist Church Historic District, roughly bounded by Cotton, Howard, Palace, Weeks Lane, and W. Johnson Greenwood, MS (McGeoy, Frank R.), NRHP-listed
Congregation Ahavath Rayim temple within Williams Landing and Eastern Downtown Residential Historic District, Roughly bounded by Front, McLemore and Lamar, Market, and George Sts. Greenwood, MS (McGeoy, Frank R.), NRHP-listed
Beaman House, Greenwood
810 Grand Boulevard, in the Grand Boulevard Historic District, Greenwood
Sunday School building of the First Methodist Church of Greenwood, 310 W. Washington St. Greenwood, MS (McGeoy, Frank R.), NRHP-listed

Personal life and death
McGeoy was married, and he had three sons. He resided at 905 Mississippi Avenue in Greenwood, Mississippi.

McGeoy died on April 13, 1940, in Greenwood.

References

1868 births
1940 deaths
People from Memphis, Tennessee
People from Greenwood, Mississippi
Architects from Tennessee
Architects from Mississippi